Omphaloceps triangularis is a moth of the family Noctuidae. It is found in Cameroon, the Republic of the Congo, the Democratic Republic of the Congo, Gabon, Ivory Coast and Uganda.

References

Moths described in 1893
Agaristinae
Insects of the Democratic Republic of the Congo
Insects of Uganda
Insects of West Africa
Fauna of the Republic of the Congo
Fauna of Gabon
Moths of Africa